Nadira Majumder (born 1 May 1953) is a Bangladeshi writer. She won Bangla Academy Literary Award (2019) and Anannya Literature Award (2019) for her contribution in the field of books about science. She resides in Czech Republic.

Background
Majumder completed her bachelor's in physics from the University of Dhaka. Professionally, she has worked as an accountant, computer programmer, financial manager, and a policy maker for the Czech Republic. She also worked as an external consultant to the United Nations High Commissioner for Refugees.

Works
Majumder writes science-related books.

 Ei Amader Prithibi
 Akmeru Bonam Bohumeru
 Mohabishshe Amrao Achi
 Biman
 Krittim Upogroho
 Agneogiri O Bhumikomper Kahini
 Nanaronger Biggan
 Einstein Superstar
 Shomoy
 Tumi Ke?

References

1953 births
Living people
University of Dhaka alumni
Bangladeshi women writers
Bangladeshi writers
Recipients of Bangla Academy Award
Place of birth missing (living people)